It's My Show with Suraj Singh Thakuri is a talk show broadcast by Kantipur Television, hosted by Suraj Singh Thakuri.

List of Episodes 
Season 1

Season 2

References 

2010s television talk shows
Kantipur Television series
2017 Nepalese television series debuts
Nepalese television talk shows
Nepali-language television shows